Fraser's forest flycatcher (Fraseria ocreata), also known as the African forest-flycatcher, is a species of bird in the family Muscicapidae.  It is found throughout the intra-tropical rainforest of Sub-Saharan Africa.

References

Fraser's forest flycatcher
Birds of the Gulf of Guinea
Birds of Sub-Saharan Africa
Fraser's forest flycatcher
Taxonomy articles created by Polbot